DLR-Tubsat (a.k.a. TUBSAT) was a German remote sensing microsatellite, developed in a joint venture between Technical University of Berlin (TUB) and German Aerospace Center (DLR). TUB was responsible for the satellite bus and DLR was responsible for the payload. The satellite was launched into orbit on 26 May 1999, on the fifth mission of the PSLV program PSLV-C2. The launch took place in the Sriharikota Launching Range. The satellite had an expected life of one year.

Mission objectives
The prime objective of DLR-Tubsat was to test the attitude control system (S/C attitude recovery from hibernation). The secondary objective of the mission was to test a TV camera system for disaster monitoring with the goal of the introduction of an interactive Earth observation concept, where the target is not identified in advance, a search action may be involved, or a particular target region has to be followed visually from orbit.

Specifications 
 Dimension: 32 x 32 x 32 cm
 Launch mass: 
 Solar panel: Four
 Batteries: Four NiH2
 Video camera: Three CCD
 16 mm wide-angle camera with black-and-white chip
 50 mm standard-angle camera with color CCD chip
 1000 mm telephoto lens camera with black-and-white chip
 Attitude control system: Three wheel / gyro pairs
 Reaction wheels: Three 
 Laser gyro: Three 
 VHF / UHF TT & C system
 S band transmitter and antenna

See also
 PSLV-C2

References 

Satellites orbiting Earth
Satellites of Germany
Spacecraft launched in 1999
Spacecraft launched by PSLV rockets